Attorney General Napier may refer to:

George M. Napier (1863–1932), Attorney General of Georgia
Sir Joseph Napier, 1st Baronet (1804–1882), Attorney-General for Ireland

See also
General Napier (disambiguation)